Joseph Chen Zhonghua (陈中华), courtesy name Dongliang (栋梁), born in 1961, Shandong Province, China, is a Chinese martial arts practitioner, teacher and author. Chen studied with two outstanding eighteenth generation Chen Style Taijiquan (陳式太極拳) experts, Hong Junsheng (洪均生; 1907 - 1996) and Feng Zhiqiang (冯志强, 1928-2012). He and his family emigrated to Canada in 1985. This has allowed him to actively promote Hong's transmission of Chen t'ai chi ch'uan(also known as the Practical Method) through his students, seminars, books, instructional videos and websites around the world.  In 2005, he was designated the International Standard Bearer of Hong's Practical Method by the Hong family in a ceremony held in Jinan (济南), China.  Since 2006, Chen has run a residential taijiquan training program on Daqingshan (“Big Green Mountain”; 大青山), Shandong Province (山东省), China. Martial arts enthusiast from all over the world can train according to traditional Chen taijiquan methods following the lineage from Chen Fake to Hong and Feng.

Early life and training with Hong Junsheng 
Chen was born in 1961 in Wulian County(五莲), Shandong Province (山东省), China. Frail since childhood, he began studying martial arts at age 9, to improve his health. He trained with various local martial arts masters, practicing traditional styles such as Tongbeiquan (通背拳 - 四通捶), Baji Quan (八极拳) and Chāquán (查拳) .

In 1979, Chen was admitted to the Department of Foreign Languages, Shandong University  (山东大学) in Jinan (济南).  He continued his martial arts training studying with Han Boyan (韩伯言, 1907 – 1996), who trained with noted Xingyiquan master Shang Yunxiang (尚霁亭). It was in Jinan that Chen heard rumors of a group of martial artists training near Black Tiger Spring (黑虎泉). After several visits, he discovered that they were training in Chen Style Taijiquan and that the teacher was Hong Junsheng (洪均生, 1907-1996). Hong was one of the longest serving disciples of Chen Fake (陳發科, 1887–1957).  Chen Fake was one of the most famous Chinese martial artists of his generation and the first person to teach Chen t'ai chi ch'uan to the general public. Hong was a traditional martial artist.  He did not advertise nor actively promote his group.  Rather, he would let his own actions or the quality of his students demonstrate the value of his teachings. Initially skeptical of the efficacy of Chen t'ai chi ch'uan, Chen became convinced after training and working with this group.  After a period of intense training, Chen became Hong’s disciple and practiced only Chen t'ai chi ch'uan as taught by Hong (also known as the Practical Method - 陳式太極拳实用拳法 ).

In Canada
In 1985, Chen emigrated to Regina, Saskatchewan, Canada to complete his master's degree in linguistics at the University of Regina. During his studies, he started to teach t'ai chi ch'uan part-time at the University.  After graduating, Chen became a teacher of Social Studies in the Canadian secondary school system in Edmonton and taught t'ai chi ch'uan on a part-time basis. Chen's initial exposure to the Western interpretation of t'ai chi ch'uan  and his own personal experience of training under Hong, lead Chen to believe that he could provide a fresh perspective on the meaning and practice of this ancient Chinese martial art.  Eventually, he would decide to devote full-time to promote the traditional Chen style teachings of his master, Hong Junsheng.  He established his first school in Edmonton, Alberta   and started his long journey in promoting the Practical Method to a new generation of t'ai chi ch'uan enthusiasts.  In order to continue his own training, he returned to China regularly with his new students to visit his teacher and t'ai chi brothers.

Disciple of Feng Zhiqiang
In 1996, Hong Junsheng died.  Joseph Chen's t'ai chi brothers introduced him to another leading Chen Style proponent, Feng Zhiqiang (冯志强, 1928-2012). Feng was one of Chen Fake's last students, training with Fake from 1950 to 1957. Through practicing with Feng, Chen experienced a different interpretation of Chen t'ai chi ch'uan.  Chen eventually became a disciple of Feng and studied with Feng at different periods until Feng's death in 2012. From Feng, Chen learned the sword form, the long staff form, Zhan zhuang (站桩) methods, and Feng’s unique elaboration on Chen Fake’s teachings, which Feng called Chen-shi Xinyi Hunyuan Taijiquan (陈式心意混元太极拳 ).  In 2002, Chen wrote "The Way of Hunyuan", an introductory text for this training system.

Hong did not appoint an 'inheritor' or 'standard bearer' for the Practical Method in his lifetime.  In 2002, the Hong Family as well as some of Hong's senior student appointed Li Enjiu (李恩久) as the official representative for the Practical Method.  In 2005, the group decided that Chen would be the ‘International Standard Bearer’ responsible for all activities outside of China.  This election was confirmed and authorized by Hong Junsheng’s sons Hong Youren and Hong Youyi, with Li Enjiu in attendance,  at the First Annual International Symposium of Chen Style Taijiquan Practical Method System held at the Shun Gen Shan Zhuang International Conference center in Jinan.

Daqingshan 
Joseph Chen Zhonghua has worked tirelessly to promote the traditional martial art of Chen Style Taijiquan since his decision to become a dedicated Taiji teacher.  He has written several books including: "Way of Hunyuan (2002); "Chen Style Taijiquan Practical Method: Theory. Volume one" (2006)  a partial translation of Hong's seminal work, Chén Shì Tàijíquán Shíyòng Fǎ, (陈式太极拳实用拳法) and "Rules for Chen Style Taijiquan (规矩:嫡传陈氏太极拳法秘要)" (2015) co-authored  with Sun Zhonghua (孙中华).   Chen had produced a series of instructional DVD's  that introduces the key concepts of the Practical Method of Chen Style Taijiquan.   Chen now has students and disciples worldwide  and he regularly travels around the world leading workshops on the Practical Method.  Starting with his first Tai Chi Studio in Edmonton, Chen's disciples are actively training according to the principles of the Practical Method across Canada.  Chen has traveled extensively in the United States teaching in location such as New York  Arizona, Iowa and New Hampshire. Chen's ideas has spread to Europe.  He has given seminars and workshops in Austria, Netherlands, Ireland, Italy   and Prague, Czechoslovakia. Chen now has disciples in Australia, Brazil, China, India, Canada, Puerto Rico, Germany, United States, Hong Kong  and Singapore.  
 
In 2006, Chen opened a large professional school at a mountain vacation resort on Daqingshan  (大青山; in Shandong, China).  Taiji students within China and from around the world can train with Chen and other disciples of Hong full-time on all aspects of the Practical Method. Zhonghua’s school is located about a 6-hour car drive from Chen Village. The latter village is the historical origin of Chen Style Taijiquan and the birthplace of Chen Fake.  In 2013, Chen hosted the first International Taiji Quan Festival on Da Qing Shan. The festival included several thousand visitors and competitors, including participation from Chen Village. By 2017, at the Fifth International Taiji Quan Festival on Da Qing Shan (大青山第五届国际太极拳大赛), more than 32 countries and regions, 130 teams, 1172 participants with more than 70 international contestants attended this event.  Making this one of the larger International Tai chi tournaments.

References

Chinese martial artists
Chinese tai chi practitioners
Martial arts school founders
1961 births
Sportspeople from Shandong
Living people